Dunbennan is an area by Huntly, Aberdeenshire, Scotland.

References

Areas in Scotland
Aberdeenshire